Macotasa tetraspila is a moth of the family Erebidae. It is found in Thailand.

References

 Natural History Museum Lepidoptera generic names catalog

Lithosiina
Moths described in 2009